Miguel Pate (born June 13, 1979 in St. Francisville, Louisiana) is an American track and field athlete. His speciality is the long jump, although during his high school and collegiate career he also competed in the triple jump, high jump, 100 m, 200 m, 4 × 100 m relay, and 4 × 400 m.

Biography
Miguel "Stay out them boxes" Pate attended West Feliciana High School in Louisiana from 1994 to 1997. After graduating West Feliciana High School he attended Meridian Junior College from 1997 until 1999 where he excelled in the triple jump and long jump and addition to playing on the basketball team his freshman year. Pate finished fourth at the National Junior College Athletic Association (NJCAA) Track and Field Championships in the long jump.

The following year Pate transferred to the University of Alabama. At the University of Alabama Pate continued to improve under the tutelage of Rod Tiffin. At the University of Alabama Pate won the 2001 World University Games and was an All American several times while competing for the Alabama Crimson Tide. However, Miguel had not yet won an NCAA Championship.

In 2002 Pate had his breakout season. Pate turned down the opportunity to sign a professional track and field contract in order to finish his eligibility. Because Pate played basketball in the winter of his freshman year at Meridian Junior College he had eligibility to compete during the NCAA indoor track and field season. At the meet Pate jumped  and won the competition by nearly two feet; with this jump, Pate also became the NCAA Indoor Long Jump record holder. Only two people have ever jumped farther indoors in human history. Pate went on to win the NCAA Championship in the long jump and was runner up in the triple jump. In the spring Pate signed a professional contract with Nike.

As a professional Pate has had a rocky career. He was second at the USATF Outdoor Championships and finished the year ranked 2nd in the world. In 2003 Pate continued his success by winning the USATF Indoor Championship in the long jump. However, at a meet in Oregon in the spring Pate injured his knee, tearing his ACL, MCL as well as other ligaments, ending his season and putting his career in jeopardy. Pate tried to return to form in 2004 but only managed to jump  that year in limited action. In 2006, Pate finished 3rd at the USATF Outdoor Championships with a jump of (7.96m/26-1.5) and had a season best jump at the Nike Prefontaine Classic (8.27m/27-1.75). Pate finished the year ranked 7th in the world (#2 in the U.S.) by T&FN. In 2007, Pate finished 2nd at the USATF Outdoor Championships (8.24m/27-0.5) and qualified for the World Outdoor Championships in Osaka, Japan where he placed 10th (7.94m/26-0.75). Pate finished the 2007 season ranked #3 in the U.S. by T&FN. In 2008, Pate finished 3rd at the USATF Outdoor Championships/Olympic Trials with a jump of (8.22/26-11.75) which qualified him for the 2008 Olympic Games in Beijing.

Achievements

Personal bests 
Long Jump   -   
Triple Jump -

External links
 
 
 
 
 
 

1979 births
Living people
American male long jumpers
People from St. Francisville, Louisiana
Athletes (track and field) at the 2008 Summer Olympics
Olympic track and field athletes of the United States
Universiade medalists in athletics (track and field)
Universiade gold medalists for the United States
Medalists at the 2001 Summer Universiade